Manukau railway station is located at the heart of the campus of the Manukau Institute of Technology in Manukau, a suburb of Auckland, New Zealand. It is the terminus station for Eastern Line services between Manukau and Britomart Transport Centre in central Auckland.

Access from the station to ground level and to surrounding streets is by stairs, lift or escalator to the ground floor of the 7-level campus building.

Station works were essentially finished by October 2011, and the Manukau Branch line, a 2.5 km spur line off the North Island Main Trunk railway, opened on 15 April 2012. Manukau station is the only station on the branch line.

The Eastern Line was the second passenger rail line in Auckland to receive electric train services, following the Onehunga Line in April 2014. Electric trains began running on some Eastern Line off-peak services on 15 August 2014, and were gradually rolled out onto all services over the following month.

In December 2014, all trains using the Eastern Line began terminating at Manukau rather than alternating between Manukau and Papakura. Similarly, all Southern Line trains began terminating at Papakura or Pukekohe.

In April 2018, Manukau was the 11th busiest train station on the Auckland network with an average of 1,650 passengers on a typical weekday.

Services
Auckland One Rail, on behalf of Auckland Transport, operates suburban services from Manukau to Britomart along the Eastern line via Glen Innes and Panmure. At off-peak, three trains per hour depart Manukau during weekday inter-peak, decreasing to two trains per hour in the evening and on weekends. At peak times, as many as six trains per hour depart Manukau.

Bus routes AirportLink, 33, 35, 36, 313, 325, 352, 353, 355, 361, 362, 365 and 366 serve Manukau station.

Bus station
In 2016, work began on the 23-bay Manukau bus station adjacent to the train station. It was officially opened on 7 April 2018, and bus services from the facility began the following day.

See also 
 List of Auckland railway stations
 Public transport in Auckland

References

Rail transport in Auckland
Railway stations in New Zealand
Railway stations opened in 2012
2012 establishments in New Zealand
Manukau City Centre
Ōtara-Papatoetoe Local Board Area